Eucalyptus laevis is a species of mallee or tree that is endemic to Western Australia. It has thin, rough, fibrous or flaky bark on the trunk, smooth bark above. Its adult leaves are linear to narrow lance-shaped, the flower buds are arranged in groups of between seven and eleven, the flowers are white and the fruit is cylindrical to barrel-shaped.

Description
It has thin, rough, fibrous or flaky bark on at least part of the trunk, sometimes also the larger branches, smooth bark above. Flowering has been observed in January and the flowers are white.

Taxonomy and naming
Eucalyptus laevis was first formally described in 2001 by Lawrie Johnson and Ken Hill from a specimen collected near Norseman and the description was published in the journal Nuytsia. The specific epithet (laevis) is variant of a Latin word meaning 'smooth' or 'free from unevenness', referring to the flower buds.

Distribution and habitat
This eucalypt grows in woodland on heavy calcareous loams in flat country between Norseman and Balladonia.

See also

List of Eucalyptus species

References

Eucalypts of Western Australia
Trees of Australia
laevis
Myrtales of Australia
Plants described in 2001
Taxa named by Lawrence Alexander Sidney Johnson
Taxa named by Ken Hill (botanist)